"So Pure" is a song written and produced by Alanis Morissette and Glen Ballard for Morissette's fourth album, Supposed Former Infatuation Junkie (1998). It was released internationally as the album's third single on June 14, 1999. One line in the song, "supposed former infatuation junkie", inspired its album's title. A special "radio friendly remix" was featured on US promotional singles and was only commercially released on the Australian domestic single.

"So Pure" peaking outside the top 20 on the US Billboard Adult Top 40 and Top 40 Mainstream charts, but it did peak inside the top 20 in Canada. "So Pure" failed to chart on the US Billboard Hot 100 and performed moderately in the United Kingdom, where it reached the top 40. In 2000, the song was nominated for Best Female Rock Vocal Performance at the 43rd Annual Grammy Awards but lost to Sheryl Crow's "There Goes the Neighborhood". The music video won the award for Best Video at 2000 Juno Awards.

Music video
The single's video, directed by Morissette, featured her and (then boyfriend) actor Dash Mihok as dance partners transitioning through time and style, from ballroom to salsa, swing, tap, contemporary and rave. It was filmed over two days in Toronto, Canada. Morissette said of the video, "Over the last year, I'd become enamored with the dancing styles of the '40s in particular, and intrigued by the evolution of dancing throughout the last five decades and the spirit and different kinds of attitudes that fuel them. When it came time to create this video, there was no question that there would be dancing in it and that these different eras needed to be referenced!" The video world-premiered on AOL on June 25, 1999, and was the first from a major artist to debut on the internet.

Track listings

Canadian CD single
 "So Pure" (album version) – 2:49
 "I Was Hoping" (acoustic modern rock live) – 4:34
 "So Pure" (Pure Ecstasy extended mix) – 6:04
 "So Pure" (acoustic modern rock live) – 2:42

US promo CD
 "So Pure" (radio friendly remix) – 2:39
 "So Pure" (Pure Ecstasy mix) – 6:04
 "So Pure" (album version) – 2:49

UK CD1
 "So Pure" (album version) – 2:49
 "I Was Hoping" (acoustic modern rock live) – 4:34
 "So Pure" (Pure Ecstasy extended mix) – 6:04

UK CD2
 "So Pure" (album version) – 2:49
 "Would Not Come" (live) – 4:13
 "So Pure" (acoustic modern rock live) – 2:42

Australian CD single
 "So Pure" (album version)
 "I Was Hoping" (acoustic modern rock live)
 "So Pure" (Pure Ecstasy extended mix)
 "So Pure" (Guido's radio friendly mix)

Japanese CD single
 "So Pure" (album version)
 "Your House" (BBC/Radio One live)
 "London" (Bridge School Benefit live)

Charts

Release history

References

1999 singles
1998 songs
Alanis Morissette songs
Juno Award for Video of the Year videos
Maverick Records singles
Reprise Records singles
Song recordings produced by Glen Ballard
Songs written by Alanis Morissette
Songs written by Glen Ballard